Bhagawanpur is a census town in Varanasi tehsil of Varanasi district in the Indian state of Uttar Pradesh. The census town and village falls under the Gourdih gram panchayat. Bhagawanpur Census town and village is about 11 kilometers southeast of Varanasi railway station, 324 kilometers southeast of Lucknow and 1.5 kilometers southeast of Banaras Hindu University.

Demography
Bhagawanpur has 1,232 families with a total population of 7,269. Sex ratio of the census town and village is 915 and child sex ratio is 714. Uttar Pradesh state average for both ratios is 912 and 902 respectively .

Transportation

Bhagawanpur is connected by air (Lal Bahadur Shastri Airport), by train (Varanasi railway station) and by road. Nearest operational airports is Lal Bahadur Shastri Airport and nearest operational railway station is Varanasi railway station (30 and 11 kilometers respectively from Bhagawanpur).

See also

 Varanasi Cantt.
 Varanasi district
 Varanasi (Lok Sabha constituency)
 Varanasi tehsil

Notes

  All demographic data is based on 2011 Census of India.

References 

Census towns in Varanasi district
Cities and towns in Varanasi district